Melbourne Knights Football Club is an Australian professional soccer club based in the suburb of Sunshine North, Melbourne. The club currently competes in the National Premier Leagues Victoria, the second-tier of the Australian soccer league system under the A-League. It is one of the most successful soccer clubs in Australia, being a two-time championship and four-time premiership winner in the now defunct National Soccer League (NSL).

The club is based in the western suburbs of Melbourne and draws much of its support from the Croatian Australian community. The club's identification with its Croatian roots remains strong. It is a regular participant in the Australian-Croatian Soccer Tournament.

The Melbourne Knights play matches at Knights Stadium, a 15,000 capacity venue (with approximately 4,000 seated) which the club has owned and operated since 1989. As well as fielding men's and women's sides, the Knight's field junior teams of all year levels.

History

Melbourne Knights FC was founded in 1953 as Croatia by a small group of Croatian immigrants in Melbourne's western suburbs. The club played its first match on 10 April 1953. The Knights became a member of the Victorian Soccer Federation in 1954, which saw the club join and compete in a league competition for the first time that same year in the newly created Victorian Provisional League. The club quickly moved up the state divisions and by the mid-1960s had become one of the strongest clubs in Victoria, winning the State League title in 1968, 1978 and 1979. In 1984 after a number of years of lobbying the Knights finally joined Australia's elite soccer competition, the National Soccer League. By the 1990s the club had become the premier soccer club in Australia as it made the NSL Grand Final 5 out of 6 seasons, winning it twice in 1994–95 and 1995–96. Following the disbanding of the NSL in 2004 the Knights dropped to the Victorian Premier League, making the Grand Final in 2008. Knights won the Dockerty Cup in 2014, when Tomislav Uskok scored a 121st-minute goal to defeat South Springvale SC at Lakeside Stadium, the club's first piece of silverware in 18 years.

Supporters

The Melbourne Knights has a large and loyal following; it is one of the best supported clubs in Australia outside the A-League. The Knights supporter base is made up mostly of people from the local Croatian community of Melbourne and Geelong, with the core of the support being from the club's heartland of Melbourne's western suburbs. This supporter base is made up of both Croatian and Australian-born Croats. The club also has a following amongst the Croatian community across the nation, this support was particularly garnered during the club's 21 seasons in the NSL where the club became a symbol of pride for the Croatian community in Australia.

The unofficial supporter group of the Melbourne Knights is the MCF (Melbourne Croatia Fans). They are the most active and vocal group in the VPL, always having a presence at matches be it at home or away. Also prominent are the supporters on Quarry Hill. In the NSL years the supporter group was the Knights Army, they were one of the leading supporter groups in the competition. They disbanded once the Melbourne Knights left the NSL.

Home ground
The club's current home ground is the Knights Stadium in the suburb of North Sunshine, which has been the club's home since 1989. It has a capacity of 15,000. More information on the Knights Stadium page.

Prior to 1989 the club had a number of venues it used as its home ground. The most significant ones were:

Royal Park, Royal Park, Melbourne: 1954: 1957
Separation St Geelong: 1958
Corio Oval, Geelong: 1959: 1961
Tracey's Speedway, Maribyrnong: 1962: 1967
Montgomery Park, Essendon: 1975 -1976
Olympic Park: permanent home from 1968 to 1972 and 1977–1988

Senior Mens squad

Non-soccer roles of the club

Social
The club has played and continues to play an important social role for the Croatian community. Post-World War II migration to Australia changed the demographic make-up of the country, Croatians along with other continental European migrants entered a society that was at the time quite hostile to these new arrivals. In the wake of this migration many soccer clubs were formed by these new arrivals based around their respective ethnic communities. The Melbourne Knights became a focal point for the Croatian community in the state of Victoria, as it was just as much a social club as a soccer club. It provided Croatians with a place to gather where they could feel comfortable and safe in their new home, a place where they could mingle with their own people and speak their mother tongue. The club allowed for the preservation and celebration of Croatian identity, tradition, culture and language, as well as promoting it to non-Croatians. Through the club Croats could hold their head up high with pride. The club continues to be an important institution for the Croatian community, helping keep it alive, as Croatian culture and tradition is passed onto the next generation. The Melbourne Knights still remains the largest meeting place for Victoria's Croatian community.

Political
Over the years the Melbourne Knights played an important political role, with the club being a symbol of Croatian nationalism. Victoria's Croatian community was made up of people who had fled from the communist regime of Yugoslavia. So the Melbourne Knights, then under the name of Croatia, served as a political statement of the desire of the Croatian people for an independent Croatia. Using the club the community was able to promote and bring awareness to the Croatian plight and independence movement. This role continued into the 90s, after Croatian independence in 1991, with the outbreak of war in Croatia and Bosnia. Melbourne Knights served as a symbol of pride for the community in this dark period, galvanizing the community's support for the club. Through the club the community was able to show its solidarity with the homeland. Since then with Croatia being independent and stable this political role no longer exists in the same manner.

Youth and Junior development

The Melbourne Knights is a club famous for its youth and junior development, it has one of the best set ups in Australia. Many great players have gone through the youth set up at the Knights, the most notable being Socceroo captain Mark Viduka. A highlight of this strong set-up came in the NSL years where the Melbourne Knights were a dominant force in the National Youth League, being champions 3 times. The club was also runner-up on two other occasions. The Knights have continued this winning tradition at the youth level in the VPL, with the club winning the double as it took out the Under 18 and Under 20 Victorian championships in 2007

Currently the club is home to over 250 players ranging in sides from the Under 8 to Under 18 level in the Victorian Milo leagues, as well as an Under 20 youth team which serves as the reserves side and plays in the Victorian Premier League Reserves competition.

The club has played a particularly important role with the youth of the Croatian community in both Melbourne and Geelong, giving them a pathway in the sport. The result of this can be seen in the many great soccer players of Croatian heritage that have played for the Knights at the senior level over the past six decades.

The success of the club's youth development can be seen in the number of Knights players that have gone onto play in some of the best soccer leagues around the world and play international soccer; 38 Knights players have played for Australia at senior level and 3 for Croatia. As well as countless others who played for Australia at Under 17, Under 20 and Under 23 levels. An example of the impact the club has had at this level was the 1996 Atlanta Olympic side (under 23) which contained a staggering 5 Knights players; Mark Viduka, Danny Tiatto, Joe Spiteri, Frank Jurić and Steve Horvat. You also had Vinko Buljibašić and Joe Bačak who were part of the qualifying campaign, while Adrian Červinski, Damien Vojtek and Ante Jurić were part of pre-qualifying friendlies.

The Knights are well known for giving young emerging talent opportunities in their senior squad. Players like; Marak Talajic debut at 16, Eddie Krncevic at 15, Josip Šimunić at 17, Steve Horvat at 17, Mark Viduka at 18, Mark Silić at 18, Billy Vojtek at 18 and more recently with Mate Dugandžić at 16. As such players that have gone through the club's junior ranks have always made up a large part the Knights squad, such as in the 1990s when the club dominated the NSL.

Rivalries

Footscray JUST
The Melbourne Knights have had many rivalries over the years. The biggest and most heated rivalry was with Footscray JUST. JUST was a Yugoslav backed club so the hate between the clubs ran deep. JUST had links to the Yugoslav communist regime, a regime that many of the Knights supporter had escaped persecution from. These were as much political battles as they were soccer matches. This rivalry began in 1960 when the clubs first met (Melbourne Knights as Preston Croat) in the Victorian State League. The club's first win against JUST came in 1965 with a 2–1 victory in the Dockerty Cup semi-final. Their first victory against JUST in the Victorian State League also came in 1965 with a 2–1 win away at Olympic Park in Round 16. After the 1972 expulsion the club would not take on JUST for over a decade. The club's last victory against JUST in the Victorian State League came in round 17 of 1972, with a 2–0 win at Olympic Park in front of 4,500 fans. Billy Vojtek scored a double.

The rivalry was resumed in 1984 with the Melbourne Knights entering the NSL. In round 25 of 1984 Melbourne Knights defeated JUST 3–1, the first victory against JUST since 1972. 1989 saw what was the greatest victory the Melbourne Knights had against JUST. The two sides that finished at the bottom of the league ladder would be relegated. JUST went into the final round third last only a point ahead of the bottom two, JUST could not afford a loss. The highly anticipated match at Middle Park was played in front of 5,000 mostly Melbourne Knights fans. The Melbourne Knights in a dominant display defeated JUST 2–0, with goals coming from Joe Caleta and Zeljko Adzić. The result saw JUST drop down into the bottom two, relegating the club to the Victorian State League. It was the very last time the two sides ever met on the field and soon after JUST would fold.

Head-to-head All-Time
Games: 35
Knights wins: 13
JUST wins: 12
Draws: 10

South Melbourne
Since the relegation of Footscray JUST from the NSL, the fiercest rivalry for the Melbourne Knights has been against South Melbourne. It has also been the longest running rivalry for both clubs, with the Knights having played South Melbourne more times than any other club. The first time the two sides met was in 1960 in the Victorian Division 1 North. The first victory the club had over South Melbourne came in 1962 (as Preston Croat) in the group stage of the pre-season Ampol Cup with the Knights winning 1–0. While the first time the Knights defeated South Melbourne in the Victorian State League was in 1965, a 3–2 win at Olympic Park. 
In the NSL the two sides would have an intense rivalry, which was heightened by the success both sides had in the league. This was clearly seen in the incredible 10 occasions the two clubs met each other in the NSL finals. The first win against South in the NSL came in round 9 of 1985, 2–0. The club would go on to play many epic matches, the two most famous coming in the 90s. 
The first came in the 1990–91 Grand Final, which South Melbourne won on penalties. The other being the 1994–95 Major Semi-Final where the Knights won 3–2, with Mark Viduka scoring a spectacular hat-trick. That win booked a spot in the Grand Final for the club. The match is regarded as one of the greatest matches in the history of Australian club soccer. For the most part these matches have been tightly fought contests, but the biggest win the Knights had against South came in 2000–01 season when Knights defeated South 4–0. This rivalry which has gone on for over 50 years continues today in the Victorian Premier League. In 2005 the Melbourne Knights defeated South Melbourne for the first time ever at South's home ground of Bob Jane Stadium, something the Melbourne Knights were never able to achieve in the NSL. The rivalry continued in the modern era with South Melbourne defeating the Knights in an elimination semi-final in front of 5,000 fans. The Knights would get their revenge a year later by knocking South out of the FFA cup with a 2–0 victory at Lakeside Stadium.

Head-to-Head total NSL games
Games: 54
South wins:25
Knights wins: 13
Draws: 16
South goals: 88
Knights goals: 58

NSL Finals games only
Games: 10
Knights wins: 5
South wins: 4
Draws: 1

Head-to-Head State League/VPL
Games: 54
Knights wins: 15
South wins: 28
Draws: 11

Head-to-Head All-Time
Games: 108
Knights wins: 28
South wins: 53
Draws: 27

Perth Glory
Perth Glory was one of the first of the new non-ethnic clubs to be introduced by Soccer Australia's president David Hill. It was all a part of the plan to broaden the supporter base of the NSL and to restructure the league. The arrival of these clubs immediately created a rivalry between the ethnic and non-ethnic clubs of the NSL. The most heated of these was the rivalry between the Melbourne Knights and Perth Glory. The rivalry really kicked off in the last match of the 1996–97 regular season. Perth was in 6th spot, holding onto the last finals spot. Perth traveling to the Melbourne Croatia Sports Centre only needed a point to ensure a finals berth. While the Knights in 7th spot, 2 points behind Perth needed nothing less than a win to get the final spot. The match was played in front of 10,000 people. Perth took an early lead. But the Knights came back with an inspired performance by Tom Pondeljak, scoring a double. The Melbourne Knights won 3–1.

The rivalry was taken to new levels in the 2000–01 season when the two sides met once more, this time in the Finals. The first leg was played at the Melbourne Croatia Sports Centre. In front of just 7,000 fans, the two sides played out a 0–0. It was a match where Perth player Bobby Despotovski made a 3 fingered Serbian salute to Knights fans. After the match, he and others in the Perth squad were attacked by Knights fans as the Perth players boarded the team bus. It made headlines across Australia. In the second leg in Perth in front of 30,000 fans, the odds were stacked against the Knights. But the side put in a phenomenal performance being up 2–0 by the 30th minute. Perth came back to level it at 2–2, but the Knights took out the tie on the away goals rule. The two sides have not played each other since the end of the NSL in 2004.

Other

Other important rivalries have been with fellow Melbourne sides Preston Lions, Green Gully, Heidelberg United and Sunshine George Cross, both at state and national level. Matches against Preston in particular have traditionally attracted large crowds, while the rivalry with Green Gully was at its most fiercest in the early 80s when the 2 sides dominated the State League. The rivalry with Sunshine George Cross has seen George Cross become the most played team for the Melbourne Knights after South Melbourne, with the first clash between the 2 sides occurring back in 1960.

In the NSL the club had significant rivalries with Sydney Olympic, Marconi Fairfield and particularly Adelaide City. The Melbourne Knights and Adelaide City were the two dominant soccer powers in the early to mid 90s, they met each other 3 times in the NSL Grand Final. The club also has friendly rivalries with fellow Croatian backed clubs Sydney United and the St Albans Saints.

In the 2007 VPL season a new rivalry was born with the Serbian backed Springvale White Eagles. The two clubs had never met each other beforehand. In their first meeting the Knights won 1–0 at home, with a last minute free kick from Anthony Pelikan. It was the first time that the Knights had ever played a Serbian side in a league match in its long history. The second match ended in a 5–2 thrashing of the White Eagles. This rivalry resumed in the 2011 VPL season, with a 1–1 draw away and a 5–0 win at home for the Knights.

Honours

^Melbourne Knights stripped of the title for fielding an un-registered player

NSL Grand Finals

NSL record
Regular season matches

Finals (Playoffs) Matches

Overall

All-time national league table
Melbourne Knights is ranked 5th out of 46 clubs that have competed in the national competition (NSL and A-League):

All-time record 1954–2017

Dynasties
In the Victorian Premier League for the 2 seasons spanning 2007: 2008 the Melbourne Knights was the number one ranked side:

In the National Soccer League for the 10 seasons spanning 1989: 1998 the Melbourne Knights was the number one ranked side:

In the Victorian Soccer League for the 7 seasons spanning 1977: 1983 the Melbourne Knights was the number one ranked side:

In the Victorian Soccer League for the 6 seasons spanning 1966: 1971 the Melbourne Knights was the number one ranked side:

Mens Team of the Century
In 2003 to commemorate the 50th anniversary of the Melbourne Knights, the club named its team of the century:
1. Peter Blasby: Goal Keeper (1978–1985)
2. George Hannah: Defender (1983–1993)
3. Steve Horvat: Defender (1993–1996, 2000–2003)
4. Steve Kokoska: Defender (1977–1983)
5. Andrew Marth: Defender (1989–1998, 2000–2004)
6. Jimmy Mackay: Midfielder (1965–1972)
7. Tommy Cumming: Midfielder (1978–1985)
8. Josip Biskic (VC): Midfielder (1982–1995)
9. Billy Vojtek: Striker (1962–1972, 1977–1978)
10. Horst Rau (C): Midfielder (1961–1972)
11. Mark Viduka: Striker (1993–1995)

Substitutes:
12. Mirko Kovaček: Goal Keeper
13. Hammy McMeechan: Midfielder
14. Josip Šimunić: Defender
15. Danny Tiatto: Midfielder
16. Kenny Murphy: Midfielder
17. John Gardiner: Defender

Coach: Mijo Kis (1968–1970, 1972, 1982)

Other Nominees:
 Keith Adams
 Bozo Bašić
 Mirko Bažić (coach)
 Ante Bilaver
 David Červinski
 Adrian Červinski
 Fausto De Amicis
 Steve Gojević
 Ivan Gruičić
 Ivan Kelić
 Ante Kuželek
 Billy McArthur
 Bill McIntyre
 David Miller
 Branko Milošević
 Tom Pondeljak
 Mark Talajić

International Mens players
The club has had and produced many players who have been Australian internationals (including 4 Socceroo captains), along with several Croatian internationals. These include:

Australia
 Zeljko Adzic
 Francis Awaritefe
 Yaka Banović
 Jim Campbell
 Pablo Cardozo
 Jason Čulina
 Tommy Cumming
 Alan Edward Davidson (C)
 Fausto De Amicis
 Robbie Dunn
 Ivan Franjic
 Eugene Galekovic
 Steve Horvat (C)
 Ante Jurić
 Frank Jurić
 Steve Kokoska
 Eddie Krnčević (C)
 Adrian Leijer
 Peter Lewis
 Jimmy Mackay
 John Markovski
 Andrew Marth
 Hammy McMeechan
 Ljubo Miličević
 Branko Milošević
 Damian Mori
 Kenny Murphy
 Jeff Olver
 Sasa Ognenovski
 Con Opasinis
 Tom Pondeljak
 Joel Porter
 Matthew Spiranovic
 Joe Spiteri
 Theo Selemidis
 Mark Talajić
 Danny Tiatto
 Kris Trajanovski
 Rodrigo Vargas
 Mark Viduka (C)
 Billy Vojtek

Angola
 Toto Da Costa

Burundi
 Elvis Kamsoba

Croatia
 Zeljko Adžić
 Joey Didulica
 Josip Šimunić

England
 Peter Beardsley
 Kevin Townson (youth international)

Ghana
 Ransford Banini (youth international)

Hong Kong
 Ross Greer

Ireland
 Ryan Casey (youth international)
 John Fitzgerald (youth international)

Lebanon

 Michael Reda

New Zealand
 Vaughan Coveny
 Greg Draper
 Brian Davidson
 Louis Fenton
 Jason Hicks
 Chris Jackson
 Leo Shin
 Paul Urlović
 Kayne Vincent
Hamish Watson (youth international)

Scotland
 Duncan MacKay
 William McLachlan (youth international)
 Ian Wallace

Solomon Islands
 Henry Fa'arodo

Uruguay
 Gustavo Biscayzacú (youth international)

Wales
 Peter Davies

Yugoslavia
 Stjepan Lamza

Individual awards
Johnny Warren Medal: NSL Player of the Year
1989–1990: Zeljko Adžić
1991–1992: Josip Biskic
1993–1994: Mark Viduka
1994–1995: Mark Viduka

Coach of the Year
1993–1994: Mirko Bažić
1994–1995: Mirko Bažić

NSL Top Goal Scorer
1993–1994: Mark Viduka
1994–1995: Mark Viduka
	  	
Sam Papasavas Award: Under 21 NSL Player of the Year
1993–1994: Mark Viduka
1994–1995: Mark Viduka

NSL Goalkeeper of the Year
1995–1996: Frank Juric

Joe Marston Medal: NSL Grand Final Man of the Match
1990–1991: Josip Biskic
1994–1995: Steve Horvat
1995–1996: Andrew Marth

Victorian Premier League Gold Medal: VPL Player of the Year
1978: Tommy Cumming
1979: Tommy Cumming
2013: Marijan Cvitkovic

Bill Fleming Medal: Media voted VPL Player of the Year
1978: Tommy Cumming
1979: Tommy Cumming
2010: Kevin Townson

Victorian Premier League Coach of the Year
2008: Chris Taylor

Jimmy Rooney Medal: VPL Grand Final Man of the Match
2008: Craig Elvin

Victorian Premier League Goalkeeper of the Year
2015: Chris May

Victorian Premier League Under 21 Player of the Year
2010: Adrian Zahra

Weinstein Medal Junior Player of the Year
1996: Ljubo Miličević

Top Mens goal-scorers
1954 to 1961: Unknown
1962: Horst Rau 6 (Preston Croat), Billy Vojtek (SC Croatia)
1963: Jim Fernie 12
1964: Billy Vojtek
1965: Ian Currie 15
1966: Billy Vojtek 9, Hammy McMeechan 8
1967: Billy Vojtek 15, Jimmy Mackay 10
1968: Bill McIntyre 11
1969: Jimmy Mackay 12
1970: Bill McIntyre 10, Billy Vojtek 9
1971: Ibro Hadiavdić 5, Joe Touricar 5
1972: Ante Kuželek 6
1975: Unknown
1976: Nick Kuzmanov
1977: Kenny Murphy 8
1978: Tommy Cumming 12, Eddie Krncevic 8
1979: Carl Gilder 14, Tommy Cumming 9
1980: Carl Gilder 8, Noel Mitten 6, Joe Tront 5
1981: Noel Mitten 10, Keith Adams 6, David Brogan 5
1982: David Brogan 18, Ossie Latif 12
1983: David Brogan 21, Tommy Cumming 19, Ossie Latif 10
1984: David Brogan 9 (2 finals), Steve Gojevic 8 (1 finals), Tommy Cumming 7 (1 finals)
1985: Gary Ward 8
1986: Paul Lewis 6
1987: Paul Lewis 10
1988: Paul Lewis 13
1989: Željko Adžić 13 (2 finals), Ivan Kelic 11, Francis Awaritefe 10
1989–90: Željko Adžić 11, Francis Awaritefe 8 (1 finals), Joe Caleta 8 (1 finals), Ivan Kelic 6
1990–91: Ivan Kelić 17 goals, Francis Awaritefe 11 (1 finals)
1991–92: Francis Awaritefe 14, Damian Mori 11
1992–93: Oliver Pondeljak 10, Ivan Kelic 9
1993–94: Mark Viduka 17 (1 finals), Adrian Cervinski 11 (2 finals), Andrew Marth 9
1994–95: Mark Viduka 21 (3 finals), Joe Spiteri 11 (1 finals)
1995–96: Andrew Marth 10 (1 finals), Joe Spiteri 9, Tom Pondeljak 9 (1 finals)
1996–97: Adrian Červinski 13 (1 finals), Ice Kutlesovski 10
1997–98: Tom Pondeljak 11, Ivan Kelic 11
1998–99: Ivan Kelić 10
1999–00: Adrian Červinski 11, Ivan Kelic 11
2000–01: Adrian Červinski 13 (1 finals), Joel Porter 12, Toto Da Costa 11
2001–02: Joel Porter 12 (1 finals), Toto Da Costa 11
2002–03: Anthony Pelikan 10, Gustavo Biscayzacu 7
2003–04: Anthony Pelikan 7
2005: Nathan Caldwell 9
2006: Nathan Caldwell 8, Andrew Barisic 7
2007: Anthony Pelikan 8 (1 finals), Joe Spiteri 6 (1 finals)
2008: Andrew Barisic 19 (1 finals), Joe Spiteri 8 (1 finals)
2009: Greg Draper 7, Joshua Groenewald 6
2010: Kevin Townson 13, Jean-Charles Dubois 8
2011: Jacob Colosimo 10
2012: Jake Nakic 6
2013: Andrew Barisic 8 (1 Finals), Jacob Colosimo 6
2014: Stipo Andrijasevic 6, Daniel Visevic 6
2015: Andrew Barisic 9, Stipo Andrijasevic 9 (1 finals)
2016: Stipo Andrijasevic 6, James McGarry 6, Jacob Colosimo 5
2017: Tom Cahill 8, Jason Hicks 7
2018: Tomislav Uskok 9, Nate Foster 8, Marijan Cvitkovic 8
2019: Hamish Watson 9
2020: Hamish Watson 5
2021: Gian Albano 7
2022: Gian Albano 12

Best and Fairest Award
1954 to 1961: Unknown
1962: Billy Vojtek
1963 to 1964: Unknown
1965: Duncan MacKay
1966: Hammy McMeechan
1967: Hammy McMeechan
1968: Hammy McMeechan
1969: Horst Rau
1970: Bill McIntyre
1971: Jimmy Mackay
1972: Ante Kuželek
1975: Unknown
1976: Unknown
1977: Ante Bilaver
1978: Tommy Cumming
1979: Tommy Cumming
1980: Steve Kokoska
1981: Steve Kokoska
1982: Keith Adams
1983: Tommy Cumming
1984: Josip Biskic
1985: Steve Gojevic
1986: Jim Campbell
1987: George Hannah
1988: Alan Davidson
1989: Željko Adžić
1989–90: Željko Adžić
1990–91: Andrew Marth
1991–92: Mark Talajic
1992–93: Andrew Marth
1993–94: Mark Viduka
1994–95: Mark Viduka
1995–96: Josip Simunic
1996–97: Andrew Marth
1997–98: Andrew Marth
1998–99: Joe Didulica
1999–00: Zeljko Susa
2000–01: Rodrigo Vargas
2001–02: Rodrigo Vargas
2002–03: Nick Sabljak
2003–04: Anthony Pelikan
2005: Adrian Cagalj
2006: Neven Antic
2007: Steve Iosifidis
2008: Craig Elvin
2009: Matthew Grbesa
2010: Tomislav Skara
2011: Anthony Colosimo
2012: Ben Surey
2013: Ben Surey
2014: Tomislav Uskok
2015: Stipo Andrijasevic
2016: Jason Hicks
2017: Elvis Kamsoba

Notable former coaches
 Jimmy Adam
 Josip Biskic
 Miron Bleiberg
 Luka Bonačić
 Branko Čulina
 Ian Dobson
 Brian Edgley
 Terry Hennessey
 Domagoj Kapetanovic
 Duncan MacKay
 Andrew Marth
 Kenny Murphy
 Peter Ollerton
 Ian Wallace
 Aljoša Asanović 
 Dean Računica

Club records
Best Result in the NSL: W 8–1 v Wollongong Macedonia at Knights Stadium (h) 7 March 1991
Worst Result in the NSL: L 0–6 v Adelaide City at Hindmarsh Stadium (a) 7 April 1991
Best Result in State Competitions: W 29–1 v Brunswick Latvia at Corio Oval (h) 29 August 1959
Best Regular season NSL Crowd (home): 11,415 v South Melbourne at Knights Stadium 5 March 2000
Best Finals Series NSL Crowd: 23,318 vs South Melbourne (1990–91 Grand Final) at Olympic Park
Biggest Unbeaten Streak: 21 games: August 1960 to March 1962 (as Preston Croat)
Biggest Winning Streak: 15 games: (as SC Croatia) March to July 1962; (as Preston Croat) August 1960 to July 1961
Biggest Winning Streak in the NSL: 7 games (in 1994)
Biggest Unbeaten Streak in the NSL: 12 games (in 1984)
Biggest Losing Streak in the NSL: 4 games (in 1998, and again in 1999)
Biggest Streak Without a Win in the NSL: 8 games (in 1998–99 and again in 1999–2000)
Biggest Unbeaten Streak in the VPL: 19 games (in 2008)
Most Goals in a Season (as a club): 81 goals in 1959
Most Wins in a Season: 21 wins in 1983
Most Points in a Season: 66 points in 1995–96
Most Goals in a Match (NSL): Ivan Kelić 6 goals v Wollongong Macedonia at Knights Stadium (h) 7 March 1991
Most Red Cards in the NSL: Andrew Marth 6 red cards
Most Consecutive Clean Sheets in the NSL: Peter Blasby 7 matches (in 1984)
Most Matches in the NSL: Josip Biskic 282 matches
Most Matches All-Time: Josip Biskic 328 matches
Most Goals in the NSL: Ivan Kelić 75 goals
Most Goals All-Time: Ivan Kelić 75 goals
Most Goals in a Season: 21 Mark Viduka in 1994–1995; David Brogan in 1983
Best Games to Goal Ratio: 0.83 Mark Viduka 40 goals in 48 games
Most Games Coached All-Time: Andrew Marth 150 games
Most Seasons at the Club: Josip Biskic 14

See also
 1. Various works of soccer historian Roy Hay 
 2. Statistics from OzFootball 
 3. The Melbourne Knights website 
 4. 'Ethnicity and Soccer in Australia' academic study

References

External links
 Official website of the Melbourne Knights

 
Association football clubs established in 1953
National Premier Leagues clubs
Soccer clubs in Melbourne
Victorian Premier League teams
Croatian sports clubs in Australia
National Soccer League (Australia) teams
1953 establishments in Australia
Diaspora sports clubs in Australia
Sport in the City of Brimbank
Sunshine, Victoria